The 1917 Calgary municipal election took place on December 10, 1917 to elect a mayor to a one year term, and a commissioner and six aldermen to two year terms, and three aldermen for a one year term. These officials sat on the thirty-fourth Calgary City Council. In addition, four members for the Public School Board, three members for the Separate School Board were elected. Also, voters voted on three plebiscites on early closing and half holiday for businesses, payment for aldermen, and election of commissioners for two years.

The nine elected aldermen joined Aldermen John Sidney Arnold, Alexander McTaggart, and Isaac Gideon Ruttle who were previously elected to Calgary City Council for two-year terms in 1916. Robert John Tallon had also been elected the previous year but had resigned to run for commissioner in this election.

Calgary's 1917 municipal election was the first election in Canada to use a system of Proportional representation, under which city councillors were elected using Single Transferable Voting (STV). They were elected at-large in a multiple-member district that covered the whole city. In this election nine councillors were elected in a single contest.

As part of the electoral reform, the mayor and commissioner were henceforth to be elected using Instant-runoff voting. But as both of those contests in this election involved only two candidates, the process was no different than [First past the post]].

Background
Extension of voting franchise to all residents male or female who are British subjects 21 years of age who have been residents of the city for six months prior to June 1 of the year of a municipal election. This was the first election in Calgary under full franchise.

Mayor Costello and Commissioner Graves had been acclaimed upon the close of nominations on December 7, 1915.

Results

Mayor

Commissioner

Councillors

Nine seats were open in this election, an unusually large number for a Canadian STV election.

Three one-year alderman position were opened on Council, following resignations of Adshead, Tallon and Patrick. The  six candidates elected with the highest "peak" votes were elected to two year terms, while the other three to be elected were elected to a one year term.

To be elected under STV, a candidate needed a number of votes equal to or exceeding quota (one-tenth of the votes cast in this election), either in first preference votes or accumulated through vote transfers from other candidates, or by surviving until the field of candidates was thinned to just the number of remaining open seats

The use of STV is said to have produced the emergence and increased representation of neighbourhood or community-based political groups on city council.

Calgary elected its first woman city councillor in this election.

Total valid votes 5189       Quota 519

Almost all front runners the first count were elected in the end. Of the top nine in the first count, only Waters was not elected, his vote tally being passed by both Mahaffy and Marshall.
But single voting in a multi-seat district produced basic fairness even before transfers were applied. Both Labour and business were represented in the font runners even in the first count.

Mahaffy, initially the 9th place candidate, gradually accumulated more votes from other candidates and when he passed quota and was elected, on about the 10th Count was holding more than 580 votes.

Plebiscite

Early closing
Early closing and half holiday.
For - 3,395
Against - 1,774

Payment of Aldermen
For - 1,807
Against - 3,019

Election of commissioners for two year terms
For - 3,814
Against - 1,183

See also
List of Calgary municipal elections

References

Politics of Calgary
Municipal elections in Calgary
1917 elections in Canada
1910s in Calgary